The 2011 Scottish Cup Final was the 126th final of the Scottish Cup, Scottish football's most prestigious knockout association football competition. The match took place at Hampden Park on 21 May 2011 and was played by Scottish Premier League clubs Motherwell and Celtic. It was Celtic's 54th Scottish Cup final and Motherwell's seventh.
Celtic won the title after they defeated Motherwell 3–0. The win was Neil Lennon's first trophy as Celtic's manager.

Route to the final

Motherwell
Motherwell entered the competition in the fourth round. They began their campaign against Dundee at Dens Park and won 4–0 thanks to goals from John Sutton (2), Steve Jennings and Jamie Murphy. Motherwell then took on Stranraer at Stair Park winning 2–0 thanks to goals from Steve Jones and John Sutton, In the quarter-final Motherwell took the journey back to Dundee to take on Dundee United at Tannadice Park, the match ended in a 2–2 draw, with both of Motherwell's goals coming from Sutton. Motherwell were then comfortable 3–0 winners in the replay back at Fir Park with goals from Murphy, Chris Humphrey and Francis Jeffers. In the semi-final, Motherwell took on St Johnstone at Hampden Park again coming out 3–0 winners with goals from Stephen Craigan, Murphy and Sutton.

Prior to this Scottish Cup final, Motherwell have won two Scottish Cups, the last of which was in 1991.

Celtic

Celtic also entered the competition in the fourth round. They began their campaign against Berwick Rangers at Shielfield Park coming out 2–0 winners, with goals from Daniel Majstorović and Scott Brown. Celtic then made the journey across Glasgow to Ibrox Stadium to take on their Old Firm rivals Rangers, the match ended in a 2–2 draw with Celtic's goals coming from Commons and Brown. Then in the replay Celtic were narrow 1–0 winners thanks to a goal from Mark Wilson. In the quarter-final, Celtic took the long journey to Inverness to take on Inverness CT. Celtic came out 2–1 winners, with both goals coming from Joe Ledley. Celtic were then 4–0 comfortable winners in the semi-final at Hampden Park against Aberdeen through goals from Charlie Mulgrew, Ledley, Commons from the penalty spot and Shaun Maloney.

Prior to this Scottish Cup final, Celtic have won 34 Scottish Cups, making them the most successful team in the tournament's history. Their last success was in 2007.

Match

Details

Media coverage
In the UK the Scottish Cup Final was shown live on BBC One Scotland on their Sportscene programme and also on Sky Sports 2 & Sky Sports HD2.

Commentary of the match on radio was from BBC Radio Scotland.

References

External links
 Official Site 

2011
Final
Scottish Cup Final 2011
Scottish Cup Final 2011
2010s in Glasgow
May 2011 sports events in the United Kingdom